Skyroof may refer to:

 Skylight, a window, dome, or opening in a roof or ceiling to admit natural light
 Sunroof, an opening in an automobile roof which allows light and/or fresh air to enter the vehicle
 Roof window, an outward opening window that is incorporated as part of the design of a roof

See also
 Skylight (disambiguation)